Sphecozone is a genus of sheet weavers that was first described by Octavius Pickard-Cambridge in 1871.

Species
 it contains thirty-four species, found in South America, the United States, and on the Trinidad:
Sphecozone altehabitans (Keyserling, 1886) – Peru
Sphecozone alticeps Millidge, 1991 – Colombia
Sphecozone araeonciformis (Simon, 1895) – Argentina
Sphecozone bicolor (Nicolet, 1849) – Chile, Argentina
Sphecozone capitata Millidge, 1991 – Peru
Sphecozone castanea (Millidge, 1991) – Brazil
Sphecozone corniculans Millidge, 1991 – Colombia
Sphecozone cornuta Millidge, 1991 – Argentina
Sphecozone crassa (Millidge, 1991) – Colombia, Brazil
Sphecozone crinita Millidge, 1991 – Ecuador
Sphecozone diversicolor (Keyserling, 1886) – Brazil, Argentina
Sphecozone fastibilis (Keyserling, 1886) – Brazil, Argentina
Sphecozone formosa (Millidge, 1991) – Ecuador
Sphecozone gravis (Millidge, 1991) – Bolivia
Sphecozone ignigena (Keyserling, 1886) – Brazil, Argentina
Sphecozone labiata (Keyserling, 1886) – Brazil
Sphecozone lobata Millidge, 1991 – Chile (Juan Fernandez Is.)
Sphecozone longipes (Strand, 1908) – Peru
Sphecozone magnipalpis Millidge, 1993 – USA
Sphecozone melanocephala (Millidge, 1991) – Brazil
Sphecozone modesta (Nicolet, 1849) – Bolivia, Brazil, Chile, Argentina
Sphecozone modica Millidge, 1991 – Argentina
Sphecozone nigripes Millidge, 1991 – Peru
Sphecozone nitens Millidge, 1991 – Ecuador, Peru
Sphecozone niwina (Chamberlin, 1916) – Peru, Bolivia, Chile
Sphecozone novaeteutoniae (Baert, 1987) – Brazil
Sphecozone personata (Simon, 1894) – Brazil
Sphecozone rostrata Millidge, 1991 – Brazil
Sphecozone rubescens O. Pickard-Cambridge, 1871 (type) – Brazil, Paraguay, Argentina
Sphecozone rubicunda (Keyserling, 1886) – Peru
Sphecozone spadicaria (Simon, 1894) – Colombia, Trinidad, Venezuela
Sphecozone tumidosa (Keyserling, 1886) – Brazil, Argentina
Sphecozone varia Millidge, 1991 – Peru
Sphecozone venialis (Keyserling, 1886) – Brazil, Argentina

See also
 List of Linyphiidae species (Q–Z)

References

Araneomorphae genera
Linyphiidae
Spiders of North America
Spiders of South America
Taxa named by Octavius Pickard-Cambridge